Charles Sellers may refer to:
Charles Mack (blackface performer) (born Charles Sellers, 1888–1934), American actor
Charles Grier Sellers (1923–2021), American historian, The Market Revolution
Charles Coleman Sellers (1903–1980), American historian, Bancroft Prize winner 1970